Oderberg is a town in the district of Barnim, in Brandenburg in northeastern Germany. It is situated 16 km east of Eberswalde, and 27 km southwest of Schwedt, close to the border with Poland, and in close vicinity of Berlin.

Overview
The territory has many lakes, remnants from the ice age. The area is widely used for outdoor recreation, such as biking, walking and boating. As Biosphere region it is home to  many species of wildlife. Oderberg is closest to the Oder river crossing leading directly to Cedynia, Poland.

Demography

Gallery

References

Localities in Barnim